Nazira Assembly constituency is one of the 126 assembly constituencies of Assam, it is a north east state of India. Nazira is also part of Jorhat Lok Sabha constituency.

Member of Legislative Assembly

★Bye elections

Election results

2021 results

2016 results

2011 results

2006 results

See also
 Nazira
 List of constituencies of Assam Legislative Assembly

References

External links 
 

Assembly constituencies of Assam
Sivasagar district